France competed at the 1960 Summer Olympics in Rome, Italy, and failed to win a single gold medal for the second time only (and, to date, the last) in the history of the modern Olympic Games. 238 competitors, 210 men and 28 women, took part in 120 events in 19 sports.

Medalists

Silver
 Michel Jazy — Athletics, Men's 1500 metres
 Robert Dumontois, Jean Klein, Claude Martin, Jacques Morel, and Guy Nosbaum — Rowing, Men's Coxed Fours

Bronze
 Abdoulaye Seye — Athletics, Men's 200 metres
 Guy Lefrant, Jack Le Goff, and Jehan Le Roy — Equestrian,  Three-Day Event Team Competition
 René Schiermeyer — Wrestling, Men's Greco-Roman Welterweight

Athletics

France had 36 competitors, 7 women and 29 men, in 25 athletics events.

Women's athletics 

 Women's 100 metres
 Catherine Capdevielle

 Women's 200 metres
 Catherine Capdevielle

 Women's 800 metres
 Maryvonne Dupureur
 Nicole Goullieux

 Women's 80 metres hurdles
 Denise Laborie-Guénard
 Simone Brièrre

 Women's high jump
 Florence Pétry-Amiel

 Women's long jump
 Madeleine Thétu

Men's athletics 

 Men's 100 metres
 Jocelyn Delecour
 Abdoulaye Sèye
 Claude Piquemal

 Men's 200 metres
 Abdoulaye Sèye – Bronze
 Paul Genevay
 Jocelyn Delecour

 Men's 800 metres
 Pierre-Yvon Lenoir

 Men's 1500 metres
 Michel Jazy – Silver
 Michel Bernard

 Men's 5000 metres
 Michel Bernard
 Hamoud Ameur

 Men's 10,000 metres
 Robert Bogey
 Hamoud Ameur
 Hamida Addèche

 Men's marathon
 Alain Mimoun
 Paul Genève

 Men's 110 metres hurdles
 Edmond Roudnitska
 Marcel Duriez
 Jacques Déprez

 Men's 3000 metres steeplechase
 Guy Texereau

 Men's 4 × 100 metres relay
 Jocelyn Delecour, Paul Genevay, Claude Piquemal, Abdoulaye Sèye

 Men's 20 kilometres walk
 Henri Delerue

 Men's 50 kilometres walk
 Jacques Arnoux

 Men's high jump
 Mahamat Idriss
 Maurice Fournier

 Men's pole vault
 Victor Sillon

 Men's long jump
 Christian Collardot
 Ali Brakchi

 Men's triple jump
 Éric Battista
 Pierre William

 Men's discus throw
 Pierre Alard

 Men's hammer throw
 Guy Husson

 Men's javelin throw
 Michel Macquet
 Léon Syrovatski

Basketball

The French men's basketball team had 12 players.

 Team
 Roger Antoine, Philippe Baillet, Christian Baltzer, Louis Bertorelle, Jean-Paul Beugnot, Jérôme Christ, Jean Degros, Max Dorigo, Henri Grange, Bernard Mayeur, Robert Monclar, Henri Villecourt

Boxing

France had eight male competitors in eight boxing events.

 Flyweight (51 kg)
 Antoine Porcel

 Bantamweight (54 kg)
 Jean Parra

 Featherweight
 André Iuncker

 Lightweight (60 kg)
 Jacques Cotot

 Welterweight (67 kg)
 Jean Josselin

 Light middleweight (71 kg)
 Souleymane Diallo

 Middleweight (75 kg)
 Yoland Levèque

 Heavyweight (+81 kg)
 Joseph Syoz

Canoeing

France had 9 competitors, 1 woman and 8 men, in 4 canoeing and kayaking events.

 Women's K-1 500 metres
 Gabrielle Lutz

 Men's K-1 1000 metres
 Michel Meyer

 Men's K-1 4 × 500 metres
 Henri Amazouze, Jean Houde, Pierre Derivery, Jean Friquet, Fredy Grosheny

 Men's C-2 1000 metres
 Georges Turlier, Michel Picard

Cycling

France had 14 men compete in six cycling events.

 Individual road race
 Jacques Gestraut
 Roland Lacombe
 François Hamon
 Raymond Reaux

 Team time trial
 Henri Duez, François Hamon, Roland Lacombe, Jacques Simon

 Sprint
 Antoine Pellegrina
 André Gruchet

 1000m time trial
 Michel Scob

 Tandem
 Roland Surrugue, Michel Scob

 Team pursuit
 Marcel Delattre, Jacques Suire, Guy Claud, Michel Nédélec

Diving

France had 4 competitors, 1 woman and 3 men, in 4 diving events.

 Women's 3 metre springboard
 Nicole Péllissard

 Women's 10 metre platform
 Nicole Péllissard

 Men's 3 metre springboard
 Georges Senecot
 Christian Pire

 Men's 10 metre platform
 Henri Rouquet

Equestrian

France had 7 male competitors in 4 equestrianism events.

 Men's three-day events, Individual and Team
 Jack Le Goff
 Guy Lefrant
 Jéhan Le Roy
 Pierre Durand Sr.

 Mixed jumping events, Individual and Team
 Bernard de Fombelle
 Max Fresson
 Pierre Jonquères d'Oriola

Fencing

France had 21 competitors, 16 men and 5 women, in 8 fencing events.

 Men's foil
 Roger Closset
 Christian d'Oriola
 Jean-Claude Magnan

 Men's team foil
 Jacky Courtillat, Jean-Claude Magnan, Guy Barrabino, Claude Netter, Christian d'Oriola

 Men's épée
 Yves Dreyfus
 Armand Mouyal
 Jack Guittet

 Men's team épée
 Armand Mouyal, Yves Dreyfus, Claude Brodin, Christian d'Oriola, Jack Guittet, Gérard Lefranc

 Men's sabre
 Claude Arabo
 Jacques Roulot
 Jacques Lefèvre

 Men's team sabre
 Marcel Parent, Claude Gamot, Jacques Lefèvre, Jacques Roulot, Claude Arabo

 Women's foil
 Catherine Delbarre
 Régine Veronnet
 Monique Leroux

 Women's team foil
 Monique Leroux, Régine Veronnet, Françoise Mailliard, Renée Garilhe, Catherine Delbarre

Football

The French men's football team had 17 players.

 Team
 Ahmed Arab, Marcel Artélésa, Raymond Baratto, Pierre Bodin, Jean-Baptiste Bordas, Claude Dubaële, Gérard Coinçon, André Giamarchi, Gines Gonzales, Marcel Loncle, François Philippe, Louis Polonia, Yvon Quédec, Charles Samoy, Max Samper, Jacques Stamm, Jean Wettstein

Gymnastics

France had 12 competitors, 6 women and 6 men, in 14 gymnastics events.

 Women's events – Team all-around, Individual all-around, Floor, Vault, Uneven bars, Balance beam
 Jacqueline Dieudonné
 Anne-Marie Demortière
 Renée Hugon
 Paulette le Raer
 Monique Rossi
 Danièle Sicot-Coulon

 Men's events – Team all-around, Individual all-around, Floor, Vault, Parallel bars, Horizontal bar, Rings, Pommel horse
 Robert Caymaris
 Bernard Fauqueux
 Jean Jaillard
 Mohamed Lazhari
 Michel Mathiot
 Daniel Touche

Hockey

The French men's hockey team had 16 players.

 Team
 Yvan Bia, Roger Bignon, Jacques Bonnet, Pierre Court, Jean Desmasures, Maurice Dobigny, Claude Dugardin, Claude Leroy, Diran Manoukian, Ido Marang, Jacques Mauchien, Gérard Poulain, Philippe Reynaud, Albert Vanpoulle, Claude Windal, Jean-Pierre Windal

Modern pentathlon

France had three male competitors in two modern pentathlon events.

 Individual
 André Bernard
 Christian Beauvalet
 Étienne Jalenques

 Team
 André Bernard, Christian Beauvalet, Étienne Jalenques

Rowing

France had 16 male competitors in three rowing events.

 Men's double sculls – 4th place
 René Duhamel, Bernard Monnereau

 Men's coxed four – 2nd place ( Silver medal)
 Robert Dumontois, Claude Martin, Jacques Morel, Guy Nosbaum, Jean Klein

 Men's eight – 4th place
 Christian Puibaraud, Jean-Pierre Bellet, Émile Clerc, Jean Ledoux, Gaston Mercier, Bernard Meynadier, Joseph Moroni, Michel Viaud, Alain Bouffard

Sailing

France had 11 male competitors in five sailing events.

 Finn – 1-person Finn (dinghy)
 Yves-Louis Pinaud

 Flying Dutchman – 2-person Flying Dutchman (dinghy)
 Jean-Claude Cornu (helmsman), Daniel Gouffier

 Star – 2-person Star (keelboat)
 Georges Pisani (helmsman), Noël Desaubliaux

 Dragon – 3-person Dragon (keelboat)
 Jean Peytel (helmsman), Philippe Reinhart, François Thierry-Mieg

 5.5 Metre – 3-person 5.5 Metre (keelboat)
 Jacques Baptiste Lebrun (helmsman), Pierre Buret, Louis Chauvot

Shooting

France had seven men participate in five shooting events.

 25 m pistol
 Jacques Decaux
 Jean Renaux

 50 m pistol
 Serge Hubert

 50 m rifle, three positions
 Pierre Guy
 Georges Wahler

 50 m rifle, prone
 Pierre Guy
 Georges Wahler

 Trap
 Claude Foussier
 Marcel Otto-Bruc

Swimming

Water polo

Weightlifting

Wrestling

See also
 France at the 1960 Summer Paralympics

References

External links
 Official Olympic Reports
 International Olympic Committee results database

Nations at the 1960 Summer Olympics
1960
Summer Olympics